is a character from the Japanese anime television series Lycoris Recoil, created by Spider Lily and Asaura. Chisato is seen as the most powerful agent among the Lycoris, a group of trained young female agents of the Direct Attack organization assigned to maintain the peace and stability of Japan, being able to dodge bullets and possessing abnormal reflexes. Despite her expertise and membership, Chisato is a pacifist and wants to live a fulfilling, peaceful life, putting her at odds with the Direct Attack's secretive and lethal ways. At the beginning of the series, she becomes the partner of Takina Inoue after the latter was transferred to Café LycoReco for disrespecting orders, teaching the latter the approaches of pacifism and getting her to enjoy living a life outside of being an agent.

Chisato was originally meant to be more serious, however this was changed to her being a cheerful and optimistic character to make her likable to the audience and her ability to dodge bullets was created as Shingo Adachi felt that only making her be able to use a gun would be too difficult. She is voiced by Chika Anzai in Japanese and Lizzie Freeman in English. Critical reception for Chisato has been positive, with praise owing to her characterization and chemistry with Takina.

Conception and creation 
Chisato's characterization was the staff's first priority and series director Shingo Adachi notes it feels as if she is writing herself on her own. Adachi also felt that Chisato should be more humanizing to make her likable to the audience and express more due to her status as a main character. Adachi describes Chisato as an intelligent, yet normal kid, not having answers to anything but following what is right in her heart, believing that her words is what drives the story forward. He also wanted her 
to speak after a moment of thinking, finding unnecessary dialogue and 
pauses to be significant and shows authenticity to a character. Chisato was intended to be a serious character who would later softened as she and Takina's relationship progresses. When Adachi later joins the project, Asaura was interested in the former's idea of happiness and type of woman, causing Chisato's current sunny characterization and is satisfied with the change. Asaura notes that due to Chisato's personality, she would be difficult to write and could only be expressed in anime. He also expressed that her changes made her the perfect fit to Takina's aloof persona' stating that if they were the same as it once was, they would both be busy people. Chisato was also originally meant to be disastified having Takina as a partner. Asaura reflects that he didn't like the plot point as the first episode would be too tense for his taste. Adachi discusses how difficult it is to present a story of a child shooting in a positive manner, thus the staff changed the focus into Chisato and Takina's developing friendship.

In her initial design, her hair was originally white with a bluish shadow to it, but Imigimuru thought she ends up looking like royalty, redesigning the hair with the same color but with yellowish shadows instead. He also wanted to give her a distinct look, thus her hair gains curls and ribbons. Imigimuru also did this as he thought that Takina and Chisato's hairstyles have to be symmetrical from each other with Takina having long-black hair and not wearing any accessories. When coming up with Chisato's abilities, she was meant to be only skilled with guns, but Adachi thought that means they would have to make a "John Wick-like movie", as it would be too difficult for a tv series. Thus, Chisato's ability to dodge bullets was created.

Voice casting 
Chisato is voiced by Chika Anzai in Japanese and Lizzie Freeman in English. Anzai was surprised by the depth of the script that she enjoyed reading it. She mentioned that the roles for auditioning were from Chisato and Takina and when reading the script, she thought she wouldn't be able to do it. She submitted her audition thinking she wouldn't be accepted. She thought that if she were accepted, she would be voicing Takina and expressed surprise that she got Chisato instead. She felt Chisato speaking to her during her scenes with Takina that she ended up forgetting she was acting. Anzai thought part of Chisato's charm is that she has her own goals that she doesn't enforce onto others and has the capacity to understand people's feelings.

Appearances in main anime series 
Chisato becomes the top among the Lycoris at a very young age and almost defeated terrorist Majima during the Radio Tower Incident. Due to her heart problems, she met Yoshimatsu and was given an artificial heart that keeps her living, giving her a new perspective in life, unaware that she was used to become a weapon. Chisato was called to be in Takina's mission. She then leaves seeing the problem resolved. She becomes Takina's partner as the latter is discharged there for disrespecting orders. The duo would go on a mission to protect Walnut, who is actually hiding in a suitcase and joins Café LycoReco after. While going to the headquarters of Direct Attack, Takina tags along in hopes of being reinstated where Takina finds she is replaced by Sakura Otome as Fuki Harukawa’s partner and forced to fight with them on a match-up. As the latter is upset of being replaced, Chisato consoles her that she has a place in the cafe. On a night while the Lycoris were forced to stay indoors, she was targeted by Majima, but is able to escape.

Chisato goes undercover to the club where Mika went to after accidentally checking out his phone and finally meets Yoshimatsu once more. After a confrontation with Majima, she went to her check-up test and was sedated by Yoshimatsu’s assistant to damage on her artificial heart, ultimately causing her death in 2 months. Chisato, along with Takina, are called to be involved with the attack against Majima. As the café will close down, Mika reveals of his and Yoshimatsu's ulterior motives. Despite this, she still chose to love them. Finding out that Yoshimatsu is held hostage, she goes to the tower that she blew up years ago and finds that Majima’s responsible for it. Later, Yoshimatsu tells her that she had a new artificial heart for her that is inside him and wants her to murder him, which she refuses. As Yoshimatsu escapes, Chisato and Takina arrive to Enkoboku to save the remaining Lycoris from being murdered as their existence had been revealed. Majima interrupts before she could join the rest, wanting to have a final showdown with her. Chisato then left, thinking she’s going to die but was then brought back by Takina as she and the rest of the workers in the café come to Hawaii.

Cultural impact

Critical reception 
Stormie McNeal of Game Rant commends Chisato's pacifistic and jubilant personality yet having the capacity to adapt in the dangerous situations she's in, describing it as unique. Charles Harford of But Why Tho? enjoys Chisato due to representing the character archetype of competitive characters who dream of living normally. Christopher Farris of Anime News Network admires Chisato's call-out towards Direct Attack in episode 3, noting that it gives more depth to her characterization. In Farris's review of episode 5, the reviewer praises the episode as it provides a narrative of how client's desire to be killed is contrasted against Chisato's philosophy and how despite finding it the truth, her willingness to save her client, shows that despite how it might be ignorant is "illustrated as a unilateral good that allows our heroes to come out the correct side of the whole manipulated messy situation." David King of Bubbleblabber applauds the show of making Chisato pacifistic from the Lycoris's usual methods. The reviewer and Charles Hartford also commend the exploration of how Chisato ends up developing her beliefs. Eric Himmelheber of Anime Corner commends the revelation of Chisato's artificial heart and how despite not having a real one, her ability to understand people shows what is believed to be the complexity behind her. Anime Ignite considers Chisato as the highlight of the anime, noting how despite her stereotypical cheerfulness, she is much more perceptive than she lets on and how the narrative revolving around her backstory gives her development, making her as what the reviewer believed to be one of the most well-written female protagonists they'd ever seen. The reviewer also praises Chizu Anzai's performance, noting that it is a part of Chisato's charm.

Harry Nugraha of Game Rant praises the bait-and-switch dynamic Chisato and Takina's hot-blooded and cold-headed relationship as the reviewer comments that while the hot-blooded and cold-blooded dynamics tend to have the former be reckless and the latter be calm and calculating, the anime switches the favor with Chisato having to reign in Takina's more violent ways, stating that it creates "a great blend of familiarity and novelty at the same time. And it also brings something surprising and refreshing to the audience that is already so used to seeing this type of pairing in their favorite anime." Christopher Farris of Anime News Networks admires the chemistry both Chisato and Takina have with their personalities and approaches to their job showcasing how the duo showing their differences. Nick Weaver of Collider considers the forming bond of Chisato and Takina to be the main appeal due to how they both learn from one another and the unlikeliness of their friendship. Eric Himmelheber of Anime Corner in the review of episode 6 finds the potential dynamic of Chisato and Majima to be interesting due to their differing methods and how Majima is someone who matches her abilities with Chisato being the one who provides intrigue to Majima. The reviewer also commends the father-daughter relationship between Mika and Chisato during episode 10, as the emotionality coupled with the shot, art, and voice acting made the reviewer believe it to be a unforgettable, beautiful scene.

Popularity and legacy 
Chisato is nominated for Best Character for the 7th Crunchyroll Anime Awards with Chika Anzai for Best VA Performance in Japanese for her role for the character. Chisato also receives including a Nendoroid, scale figure, and watches. Hideo Kojima tweeted a picture of one of his mannequins recreating one of Chisato's poses in episode 4, attracting the attention of Asaura and Imigimuru. On Spotted Eel Day, November 11, Sumida Aquarium commemorates Chisato for imitating said eels in its Twitter account.

References 

Female characters in anime and manga
Fictional female secret agents and spies
Fictional waiting staff
Teenage characters in anime and manga
Television characters introduced in 2022